Rot am See is a town in the district of Schwäbisch Hall in Baden-Württemberg in Germany with a population of 5,388 as of December 31, 2018.

History

Shooting 

On January 24, 2020, it was the site of a mass shooting which killed six.

Twin towns
Rot am See is twinned with:

  Weyersheim, France, since 2000
  Chatte, France, since 2002

References

Schwäbisch Hall (district)